The Taktikon Uspensky or Uspenskij is the conventional name of a mid-9th century Greek list of the civil, military and ecclesiastical offices of the Byzantine Empire and their precedence at the imperial court. Nicolas Oikonomides has dated it to 842/843, making it the first of a series of such documents extant from the 9th and 10th centuries. The document is named after the Russian Byzantinist Fyodor Uspensky, who discovered it in the late 19th century in a 12th/13th-century manuscript (codex Hierosolymitanus gr. 39) in the library of the Eastern Orthodox Patriarchate of Jerusalem, which also contained a portion of the Kletorologion of Philotheos, a later .

Editions 
 Russian edition, by F. Uspensky: 
 French edition, by N. Oikonomides:

References

Sources 
 
 
 

9th-century books
Byzantine literature
Government of the Byzantine Empire
Handbooks and manuals
840s in the Byzantine Empire